Fern Marie Brady (born 26 May 1986) is a Scottish comedian and writer.

Early life
Brady was born in Bathgate, West Lothian, where she grew up. She went to school at St. Kentigern's Academy, Blackburn in West Lothian. She is of Irish descent. Her father worked at the truck company Scania, and her mother worked at Tesco. Her parents have since divorced.

Career
While at the University of Edinburgh, Brady was editor of The Student, a weekly newspaper produced by students. To finance her university studies, she worked as a stripper. She graduated with a Bachelor of Arts in Arabic and Islamic History. Following university, Brady originally trained to become a journalist, although she had been thinking about becoming a stand-up comedian since 2006. In 2009, she was an intern at Fest Magazine, a free magazine covering the Edinburgh Festival. One of her assignments there was to write an article about a comedy critic trying stand-up. Brady describes the experience as "the push I needed to realise it was what I wanted to do". Her first professional gig was in May 2010.

She reached the finals of "So You Think You're Funny" at the 2011 Edinburgh Festival Fringe, where she was placed joint third; the finals of the Piccadilly Comedy Club new act competition in 2012, and the Hackney Empire New Act of the Year in 2013. She has appeared on 8 Out of 10 Cats, Seann Walsh's Late Night Comedy Spectacular, The Alternative Comedy Experience, BBC Radio 4's The News Quiz, series 3 of Live from the BBC, series 14 of Live at the Apollo and on series 3 of Frankie Boyle's New World Order. She has written for The Guardian.

In 2020, Brady and fellow comedian Alison Spittle started a podcast for the BBC called Wheel of Misfortune.

In late 2021, Brady co-presented the Dave travelogue British as Folk alongside fellow comedians Ivo Graham and Darren Harriott. In January 2022, Brady began a 25-date tour of her new show, Autistic Bikini Queen. In June 2022, Brady was confirmed to be a contestant in the 14th series of Taskmaster, which started airing in September 2022.

In 2023, her memoir, Strong Female Character, was published by Brazen.

Personal life
Brady is bisexual. She was misdiagnosed with obsessive–compulsive disorder (OCD) at the age of 16, and revealed in 2021 that she has been diagnosed as autistic.

References

External links
 Official website
 
 
 Guardian articles
 Chortle page

1986 births
Living people
Scottish women comedians
People from Bathgate
Scottish people of Irish descent
Scottish LGBT comedians
Scottish bisexual writers
Bisexual comedians
Bisexual women
People on the autism spectrum
People with obsessive–compulsive disorder
Alumni of the University of Edinburgh
British female erotic dancers
British women memoirists
Scottish memoirists